Virtue Party (FP) was an Islamist political party established on 17 December 1997 in Turkey. It was found unconstitutional by the Constitutional Court and then banned on 22 June 2001 for violating the secularist articles of the Constitution. After the party's ban, the party MPs founded two sections of parties: reformist Justice and Development Party (AKP), headed by Recep Tayyip Erdoğan, and traditionalist Felicity Party (SP), headed by Recai Kutan.

History
Founders of the Virtue Party were also active members of the National Order Party (MNP), National Salvation Party (MSP) and Welfare Party (RP).

Merve Kavakçı, the female elected as the MP who was banned from swearing her oath in Turkish Grand National Assembly because she wore a headscarf, was a Virtue Party member.

Former party chairman Mehmet Recai Kutan submitted a case on behalf of the party to the European Court of Human Rights, alleging infringement of Articles 10 (freedom of expression) and 11 (freedom of association) among others. In December 2005, Kutan told the court that he intended to withdraw the application, possibly influenced by the unfavourable result in Leyla Şahin v. Turkey (2004), and the court struck out the case.

Footnotes

References
 

Defunct political parties in Turkey
Defunct far-right parties in Turkey
Banned Islamist parties in Turkey
Political parties established in 1997
1997 establishments in Turkey
Political parties disestablished in 2001
2001 disestablishments in Turkey
European Court of Human Rights cases involving Turkey